Sávio Oliveira do Vale  (born 11 November 1984) is a Brazilian football midfielder who most recently played for Sport Club São Paulo in the Campeonato Gaúcho.

Career 
Born in Rio Grande, he played in the youth team of Sport Club São Paulo. His career as senior begin in 2005 with Esporte Clube Pelotas. After two seasons he moved to Porto Alegre Futebol Clube. In 2007, he moved abroad by signing with FK Zeta, playing in the Montenegrin First League.

In June 2009, he signed for Red Star Belgrade, along with Cadú, having both been playing together since 2007, first in Porto Alegre then in Zeta. After almost two seasons playing for Red Star Belgrade, he was loaned to Chinese side Changchun Yatai on 26 January 2011. The Chinese club later stated that they terminated this deal with Savio. In the summer of 2011, he returned to Red Star.

Career statistics

References

External links 
 
 
 Sávio Oliveira do Vale Stats at Utakmica.rs

1984 births
Living people
Sportspeople from Rio Grande do Sul
Brazilian footballers
Brazilian expatriate footballers
Association football midfielders
Esporte Clube Pelotas players
Porto Alegre Futebol Clube players
FK Zeta players
Expatriate footballers in Montenegro
Red Star Belgrade footballers
Serbian SuperLiga players
Expatriate footballers in Serbia
Changchun Yatai F.C. players
Expatriate footballers in China